Clematis Brook was an MBTA Commuter Rail station in Waltham, Massachusetts. It served the Fitchburg Line, and was located in the Warrendale section of Waltham. It was closed in 1978 due to poor ridership.

History

The Fitchburg Railroad was completed through Waltham in 1845. In 1881, it was joined by the Central Massachusetts Railroad, which paralleled it from west of Beaver Street to the Fitchburg Cutoff. Both railroads had Clematis Brook stations located on the east side of Beaver Street. The Boston and Maine Railroad (B&M) gained control of the Central Massachusetts in 1887, followed by the Fitchburg in 1900. By 1904, Clematis Brook was served by a single station between the two lines; similar consolidation of nearby Waverley, Belmont, and Hill Crossing came later.

In 1952, the B&M abandoned the duplicate Central Mass tracks during a grade separation project at Waverley. After the track consolidation, the Central Mass Branch diverged from the Fitchburg mainline just west of Clematis Brook. By the time the MBTA began subsidizing service in 1965, Clematis Brook was no longer served by the single Central Mass Branch round trip (which was discontinued in 1971). Like nearby Beaver Brook station, Clematis Brook was only served by a handful of rush hour trips. The two stations were closed in June 1978, along with Winchester Highlands station on the Lowell Line, due to poor ridership. No remains of the station are present.

References

External links

MBTA Commuter Rail stations in Middlesex County, Massachusetts
Former MBTA stations in Massachusetts
Waltham, Massachusetts
Railway stations closed in 1978
1978 disestablishments in Massachusetts